Franz Seraphin Lauska (13 January 1764 – 18 April 1825), baptised as Franciscus Ignatius Joannes Nepomucensis Carolus Boromaeus, was a Moravian pianist, composer, and teacher of Giacomo Meyerbeer. The name "Seraphin" was a later name affix, which Lauska never used. Lauska was considered "one of the most brilliant executants of his time."

Biography 
Lauska was born in Brno, and may have been a student of Johann Georg Albrechtsberger while studying in Vienna in 1784. He also spent time in Italy, played chamber music while serving at the Bavarian court in Munich, taught in Copenhagen from 1794 to 1798, and then moved to Berlin. There he performed as a pianist, wrote music, and was a piano teacher of the Prussian royal family and the young Giacomo Meyerbeer. He conducted the Sing-Akademie zu Berlin in rehearsals while Carl Friedrich Zelter was away in 1802 and later became a member of Zelter's Liedertafel. Lauska probably knew Beethoven, for whom he read proofs, and was friends with Carl Maria von Weber, who dedicated his second sonata in A-flat major to Lauska.  Around 1816 he gave piano lessons to Felix and Fanny Mendelssohn. He died in Berlin, aged 61.

Works 
Lauska wrote a great deal of piano music (approximately 25 sonatas, rondos, variations, polonaises, capriccios, etc.), much of it technically undemanding and intended for beginners, amateurs, and his pupils. His music is uncomplicated and typical of the musical style at the time. The following list of works is incomplete. A complete, dated catalogue of works has been published recently.
 Piano music:
 Grande Sonate, Op. 1, for harpsichord or piano (Hamburg, ca. 1795) 
 Menuette varié, for piano, on a theme from Sonata, op. 1 (Copenhagen, no date) 
 Grande Sonate, Op. 4, for harpsichord or piano (Hamburg, ca. 1797) 
 Eine grosse Sonate für's Pianoforte, Op. 6 (Hamburg, 1797)  
 Sonata, Op. 7, for piano (Hamburg, 1797) 
 Eight variations for piano on the air "Ich küsse dich o Schleier" from Geister Insel by Reichard (Munich, 1799) 
 Grande Sonate, Op. 9 (Hamburg, ca. 1800) 
 Grande Sonate, Op. 10 (Hamburg, ca. 1800) 
 Sonata, Op. 20, for piano (Leipzig, ca. 1812) 
 Polonaise, Op. 23 (Leipzig, ca. 1815) 
 Polonoise, Op. 25 (Leipzig, ca. 1809) 
 Sonata, Op. 26 (Leipzig, ca. 1810) 
 Rondeau and polonaise, Op. 27 (Berlin, ca. 1815) 
 Deux grandes polonaises en forme de rondeau, Op. 29 (Berlin, ca. 1812) 
 Capriccio, Op. 32, for piano (Leipzig, ca. 1815) 
 Grande Sonate, Op. 34 (Berlin, no date) 
 Sonata, Op. 35 (Berlin, no date) 
 Capriccio and Polacca, Op. 36, for piano (Leipzig, ca. 1819) 
  Petites Variations sur l'air Vive Henry IV, Op. 36 (also) (C.C. Lose, Copenhagen, ca. 1820s?) (ÖNB)
 Sonate brillante, Op. 37 (Leipzig, ca. 1818) 
 Capriccio e Variazioni sopra una Canzonetta Boemica (To gsau Kone, to gsau Kone, to gsau Kone...), Op. 38 (Leipzig, CF Peters, ca. 1818) 
 Polonoise, Op. 42, for piano (Leipzig, no. date) 
 Rondeaux brillants et agréables, Op. 44 (Leipzig, ca. 1820) 
 Sonate agreeable, Op. 46 (Leipzig, no date) 
 Der Fackeltanz, for piano four hands (Berlin, ca. 1823) 
Chamber music:
 Sonate facile, Op. 18, for piano and violin (Munich, 1802–1803)
 Sonata, Op. 28, for piano and cello (Berlin, ca. 1812) 
 Introduzzione e rondoletto for piano and cello (Berlin, ca. 1818–1819)
 Vocal music:
Neun deutsche Lieder und Variationen, Op. 2, for voice and piano (Hamburg, 1792) 
Lied von den Militair-Eleven (Munich, 1806) 
 Twelve songs for voice and guitar (Hamburg, before 1821) 
 Fünf Tafel-Lieder für Männerstimmen, for the Liedertafel in Berlin (Berlin, ca. 1826) 
 Mass
 Quando corpus morietur for 4 voices (1825)
 Orchestral and Concertante works
 Concerto for harpsichord or piano and orchestra

Notes

Sources 
 Brzoska, Matthias (2001). "Meyerbeer [Beer], Giacomo [Jakob Liebmann Meyer]" in Sadie 2001.
 Meyerbeer, Giacomo;Letellier, Robert Ignatius, editor (1999). The Diaries of Giacomo Meyerbeer, Volume 1, 1791–1839. Madison, New Jersey: Fairleigh Dickinson University Press. .
 Sieber, Anke (2016): Franz Lauska (1764–1825). Biographie, Briefe, Werkverzeichnis. Göttingen: Hainholz .
 Thompson, Oscar; Bohle, Bruce, editors (1975). The International Cyclopedia of Music and Musicians (tenth edition, edited by Bruce Bohle). New York: Dodd, Mead. .
 Sadie, Stanley, editor (2001). The New Grove Dictionary of Music and Musicians, 2nd edition. London: Macmillan.  (hardcover).  (eBook).
 Wagner, Undine (2001). "Lauska [Louska, Lausca], Franz [Franz Seraphicus; Franz Seraphinus; František Ignác]" in Sadie 2001.

External links 

1764 births
1825 deaths
Czech Classical-period composers
Czech male classical composers
Czech classical pianists
18th-century keyboardists
Male classical pianists
19th-century Czech male musicians